This is a partial discography of Parsifal, an opera in three acts by Richard Wagner.

Parsifal was expressly composed for the stage at Bayreuth 
and many of the most famous recordings of the opera come from live performances on that stage. In the pre-LP era, Karl Muck conducted excerpts from the opera at Bayreuth which are still considered some of the best performances of the opera on disc (they also contain the only sound evidence of the bells constructed for the work's premiere, which were later melted down by the Nazis during World War II). Hans Knappertsbusch was the conductor most closely associated with Parsifal at Bayreuth in the post-war years, and the performances under his baton in 1951 marked the re-opening of the Bayreuth Festival after the Second World War. These historic performances were recorded in mono sound, originally issued but now no longer available on the Teldec label, and reissued in 2003 on Naxos Historical. Knappertsbusch recorded the opera again for Philips in 1962 in stereo, and this release is often considered to be the classic Parsifal recording.
There are also many "unofficial" live recordings from Bayreuth, capturing virtually every Parsifal cast ever conducted by Knappertsbusch.

Amongst the studio recordings, those by Georg Solti, Herbert von Karajan and Daniel Barenboim (the latter two both conducting the Berlin Philharmonic) have been widely praised. The von Karajan recording was voted "Record of the Year" in the 1981 Gramophone Awards. Also highly regarded is a recording of Parsifal under the baton of Rafael Kubelík. Originally recorded for Deutsche Grammophon but never released, it is now available on the Arts Archives label.

On the Saturday 14 December 2013 broadcast of BBC 3'S CD Review – Building a Library, music critic David Nice surveyed recordings of Parsifal and recommended the 1980 recording by the Symphonieorchester des Bayerischen Rundfunks, Rafael Kubelik (conductor), as the best available choice.

Audio recordings

Video recordings
This is a partial filmography of Parsifal (1882), an opera in three acts by Richard Wagner. In addition to the productions of the complete opera listed below, there is a 1998 documentary directed by Tony Palmer, titled: Parsifal – The Search for the Grail. It was recorded in various European theaters, including: the Mariinsky Theatre, the Ravello Festival, Siena, and the Bayreuth Festival. It contains extracts from Mr. Palmer's stage production of Parsifal starring Plácido Domingo, Violeta Urmana, Matti Salminen, Nikolai Putilin and Anna Netrebko. It includes interviews with Domingo, Wolfgang Wagner, Robert Gutman and Karen Armstrong. The film exists in two versions: (1) a complete version running 116 minutes and officially approved by Domingo, and (2) an 88-minute version, cut as a result of being censored in Germany as being too "political", "uncomfortable" and "irrelevant".

References
Notes

Sources
 Brown, Jonathan (1992). Parsifal on Record : a discography of complete recordings, selections, and excerpts of Wagner's music drama (Westport, Conn.: Greenwood Press). 
 Recordings of Parsifal, wagnerdisco.net

Opera discographies
Discography